Albert Edward Cooper (23 September 1910 – 12 May 1986) was a Conservative Party politician in the United Kingdom.

He was twice Member of Parliament for Ilford South, from 1950 to 1966, and again from 1970 to 1974. At the end of both terms he lost to Labour candidate Arnold Shaw.

References

Bibliography

Times Guide to the House of Commons February 1974
Speeches in Parliament and other information from They Work For You

1910 births
1986 deaths
Conservative Party (UK) MPs for English constituencies
UK MPs 1950–1951
UK MPs 1951–1955
UK MPs 1955–1959
UK MPs 1959–1964
UK MPs 1964–1966
UK MPs 1970–1974